Brush-Moore Newspapers, Inc. was a United States newspaper group based in Ohio which had its origins in 1923 and was sold to Thomson Newspapers in 1967 for $72 million, the largest ever newspaper transaction at that time.

In 1923, Louis Herbert Brush, who had joined the Salem News (of Salem, Ohio) as a manager in 1894 and purchased it in 1897, entered into a partnership with Roy Donald Moore and William Henry Vodrey, Jr. to purchase The Marion Star from then-U.S. President Warren G. Harding.  By 1924, Time magazine already noted the group as one of the prominent newspaper groups in the country, with four papers and a total circulation of 30,906.  In 1927, the "Brush-Moore" chain was created from their holdings.

Joseph K. Vodrey, son of W.H. Vodrey Jr., became general manager of Brush-Moore Newspapers, Inc. in 1946.  Vodrey was Vice-President and a member of the Brush-Moore board of directors from 1951 to 1968, when he retired.  He also served as Vice-President and as a Director of the Beaverkettle Company.

At the time of the 1967 sale, Brush-Moore owned 12 daily papers, including six in Ohio (the Canton Repository, East Liverpool Review, Salem News, Steubenville Herald, Marion Star, and Portsmouth Times) three in California (Times-Standard, San Gabriel Valley Tribune, and Oxnard Press-Courier), and one in Maryland (Salisbury Daily Times), Pennsylvania (Hanover Evening Sun), and West Virginia (Weirton Daily Times), with a total circulation of approximately 540,000.

Holdings

Ohio
 Salem News. Owned by Brush since 1897.  Sold to Thomson in 1967.
 East Liverpool Review. Acquired by Brush in 1901. Sold to Thomson in 1967.
 The Marion Star. Acquired in 1923 from President Warren G. Harding. Sold to Thomson in 1967.
 Steubenville Herald Acquired 1925.  Sold to Thomson in 1967.
 Canton Repository.  Acquired 1927.  Sold to Thomson in 1967.
 Portsmouth Times.  Acquired 1930. Sold to Thomson in 1967.
 Canton Daily News.  Acquired and shut down this 97-year-old paper in 1930, leaving Brush-Moore with the only evening paper in the town.
 Ironton Tribune.  Acquired 50% interest in 1930, and full ownership in 1955.  Sold in 1960s prior to sale to Thomson.

California
 San Gabriel Valley Tribune. Acquired 1960.  Sold to Thomson in 1967.
 Oxnard Press-Courier.  Acquired 1963.  Sold to Thomson in 1967.
 Times-Standard (Eureka).  Acquired in 1967, and sold to Thomson the same year.

Other
 Salisbury Daily Times (Maryland).  Acquired 1937.  Sold to Thomson in 1967.
 Hanover Evening Sun (Pennsylvania).  Acquired 1958.  Sold to Thomson in 1967.
 Weirton Daily Times.  Acquired 1962.  Sold to Thomson in 1967.
 In 1964, Brush-Moore attempted to purchase the Arizona Daily Star.

Radio
Ohio Broadcasting Co. was a subsidiary of Brush-Moore which focused on radio interests.

 WHBC (AM) (Canton, Ohio).  Purchased 1936.
 WPAY (AM) (Portsmouth, Ohio), acquired in 1944 through purchase of Scioto Broadcasting company.
 WONE (AM) (Dayton, Ohio).  Purchased in 1961, sold in 1964 to Group One Broadcasting.
 WONE-FM (now WTUE) (Dayton, Ohio).  Purchased in 1961, sold in 1964 to Group One Broadcasting.
 WONE-TV (now WKEF).  Dayton television station, purchased in 1961, sold in 1963 to Springfield Television.
 WPDQ (Jacksonville, Florida).  Sold in 1964 to Belk Broadcasting Co.

References

Defunct newspaper companies of the United States